Sumut is a 1973 album by the Greenlandic rock band Sume.

Sumut may also refer to:

 Sumut, abbreviation for Sumatera Utara, or North Sumatra
 , North Sumatra-based regional bank
 Bank Sumut FC, 2010 Indonesian Futsal League
 The Children of Sumut, children's book by :de:Gerda Rottschalk
 As-sumūt, directions in Arabic poetry (plural of samt سَمْت ), origin of Azimuth